"Hello" is a remake song recorded by South Korean singer and Red Velvet member Joy. Originally recorded and released by singer Park Hye-kyung in 2003, the song was re-recorded and was released on May 31, 2021, by SM Entertainment as a title track from her special remake album of the same name. Composed by Kang Hyun-min and also written by him along with Park Hye-kyung and Park Ji-won, the track was described as a modern rock genre song. It is about forgetting the hard days and celebrating a new day. The song peaked at position 10 on the Gaon Digital Chart and Billboard K-Pop Hot 100.

Background and composition 

SM Entertainment revealed that Joy will be releasing "Hello" as the title track for her special album of the same name at 6:00 PM of May 31, 2021. It was reported that starting from the title song, mood samplers and track posters for each song in the album will be released sequentially. The track is a remake of the same name released by singer Park Hye-kyung in 2003.

"Hello" was composed by Kang Hyun-min, while the lyrics were also written by him along with Park Hye-kyung and Park Ji-won. Musically, it was described as a modern rock genre song. The track is noted for its "speedy arrangement of cheerful brass music", in which was described as "enough to feel a different charm" from the original song. Moreover, Joy is praised on the track for her "cool vocals". The song is composed in the key of D major with a tempo of 93 beats per minute. Lyrically, it is described as "hopeful" as it conveys a message of forgetting about the hard days and celebrating a new day.

Commercial performance 
The track debuted at position 16 on the 23nd weekly issue of South Korea's Gaon Digital Chart for 2021 during the period dated May 30 – June 5. It charted at position 11 on the following week with chart issue dated May 30 – June 5. The following week, it peaked at position 10. The song also debuted and peaked at position six on the component Download Chart. It also debuted at position 24 on the component Streaming Chart and peaked at position 13. In addition, it debuted at position 26 on the component BGM chart. The song entered the Billboard K-Pop Hot 100 at position 43 on the chart issue dated June 12, 2021, and peaked at position 10 two weeks later.

Credits and personnel 
Credits adapted from the liner notes of Hello.

Studio

 Recorded, edited, and engineered for mix at SM Big Shot Studio
 Recorded at Prelude Studio
 Recorded at Seoul Studio
 Mixed at SM Blue Cup Studio
 Mastered at 821 Sound Mastering

Personnel

 Joyvocals
 Park Hye-kyungsongwriting
 Kang Hyun-minsongwriting, composition
 Park Ji-wonsongwriting
 Kenziearrangement, vocal directing, piano
 Choi Hoonbass
 Hong Joon-hoguitar
 Nile Leebrass, conducting
 Kim Sang-ilsaxophone
 Kim Soo-hwansaxophone
 Kim Dong-hatrumpet
 Lee Dong-kitrumpet
 Lee Han-jintrombone
 Yoo Dong-wantrombone
 Lee Min-kyurecording, digital editing, mixing engineer
 Lee Chang-sunrecording
 Jung Ki-hongrecording
 Choi Da-inrecording assistant
 Jeong Eui-seokmixing
 Kwon Nam-woomastering

Charts

Weekly charts

Monthly charts

Year-end charts

Accolades

Awards and nominations

Lists

Release history

References 

2021 singles
2003 songs
Joy (singer) songs
SM Entertainment singles